Priscilla Herdman (born February 11, 1948) is an American folk singer, whom The New York Times called "one of the clearest and most compelling voices of contemporary folk music." Although she has written songs, she is notable chiefly for her interpretations of other artists' work.

Early life
Born in Eastchester, New York in 1948, she attended the University of Iowa, finishing her studies at the Fashion Institute of Technology in New York.  While working in the fashion industry, she began to play in the coffeehouses of Greenwich Village and the church basements of the Upper West Side, and toured in Europe. In 1976, she moved to Philadelphia and decided to become a professional singer.

Music career
Her first album, The Water Lily, was released in 1977, on the Philo label.  In 1980, her second album, Forgotten Dreams, consisting mainly of covers of songs by 
contemporary North American songwriters, was released on the Flying Fish label.  In 1982, Herdman left Philadelphia and moved to the small rural community of Pine Plains, New York, where she met her husband, Dick Hermans. In 1983 she then released her third album, Seasons of Change.  To date, Herdman has released 12 albums, including several in a trio with Anne Hills and Cindy Mangsen.

Discography

Studio albums
 1977: The Water Lily (Philo)
 1980: Forgotten Dreams (Flying Fish)
 1983: Seasons Of Change (Flying Fish)
 1987: Darkness Into Light (Flying Fish)
 1988: Stardreamer: Nightsongs and Lullabies (Alacazam!)
 1990: Voices (Flying Fish) - with Anne Hills and Cindy Mangsen
 1993: Daydreamer (Music For Littl)
 1995: Forever & Always (Flying Fish / New Rounder)
 1997: Voices of Winter (Gadfly) - with [Anne Hills and Cindy Mangsen
 1998: Moondreamer (Redwing)
 2000: At the Turning of the Year (Hand & Heart)
 2003: The Road Home (Redwing)
 2009: Into the Stars (Stardreamer)

As composer
 1981: Martyn Wyndham-Read - Emu Plains (Fellside) - track 5, "Water Lily" (co-written with Henry Lawson)

Also appears on
 1977: Jim Ringer - Tramps & Hawkers (Philo) - vocals
 1981: Bill Staines - Rodeo Rose (Philo) - vocals
 1983: Martin Curtis - Gin & Raspberry (Cityfolk) - vocals
 1985: Fred Small - No Limit (Rounder) - vocals
 1992: Cindy Mangsen - Songlines (Compass Rose) - vocals
 1993: Allen Power - The Healing Arts (Beacon) - vocals
 1993: various artists - Christine Lavin Presents: On a Winter's Night (Philo) - track 15, "Stars"
 1994: Anne Hills and Cindy Mangsen - Never Grow Old (Flying Fish)
 1995: Anne Hills - Angle of the Light (Flying Fish)
 1996: Jay Ansill - A Lost World (Poems of Robert Graves Set as Songs) (Beacon) - vocals
 1998: Anne Hills - Never Grow Up (Flying Fish)
 1998: Cindy Mangsen - Songs of Experience (Redwing) - vocals
 2009: Anne Hills - Points of View (Appleseed) - vocals

References

Bibliography
 Michael Erlewine & Scott Bultman (ed.) (1992) All Music Guide, 1st ed., p. 509, .
 Neal Walters & Brian Mansfield (ed.) (1998) MusicHound Folk: The Essential Album Guide, p. 360-361,  (the source of her birth date).
 Carlin, Richard (2007) American Popular Music: Folk, p. 94, .

External links
 Official web site
 
 

American folk singers
American women singer-songwriters
1948 births
Living people
Fashion Institute of Technology alumni
20th-century American guitarists
Flying Fish Records artists
20th-century American women guitarists
21st-century American women